Bufo eichwaldi, commonly known as Eichwald's toad or the Talysh toad, is a species of true toads in the family Bufonidae. It was first described by Litvinchuk, Borkin, Skorinov and Rosanov in 2008 and is found in the Talysh and Elburz Mountains in Azerbaijan and parts of northern Iran. It was previously considered to be a subspecies of the Caucasian toad (Bufo verrucosissimus).

Description
Bufo eichwaldi is a large toad much resembling Bufo verrucosissimus in appearance. It is a uniform dull brownish grey colour and has large round tubercles on its back and smaller ones on its belly. It differs from B. verrucosissimus in that the body has different proportions, the head has an abrupt, unrounded snout and the parotoid gland has black markings where it touches the tympanum. The male has dark spots on its otherwise pale belly and is considerably smaller than the female.

Distribution and habitat
Bufo eichwaldi is believed to occur in south east Azerbaijan and northern Iran in the Talysh and Elburz Mountains. It also occurs in Mazandaran and Gilan provinces in Iran near the Caspian Sea. Its habitat is broad-leaved forests but it is also sometimes found in lowland swamps and gardens.

Biology
Nowhere is Bufo eichwaldi abundant or easily seen as it hides during the day, emerging after nightfall to forage for small invertebrates. Breeding takes place in shallow waters at the edge of springs.

Status
The IUCN Red List of Threatened Species lists this species as vulnerable. It is threatened by habitat loss as the forests in which it lives are being felled for timber.

References

eichwaldi
Amphibians described in 2008
Amphibians of Azerbaijan
Amphibians of Iran